A U-Key is an implementation of the MIFARE RFID chip, encased in a plastic key style housing. It is used as a prepayment system on vending machines and for some self-service diving air compressors  in Switzerland

References

Smart cards
Radio-frequency identification
Automatic identification and data capture